Terry George Martin (born October 25, 1955) is a Canadian former professional ice hockey forward who played in the National Hockey League (NHL) for the Buffalo Sabres, Quebec Nordiques, Toronto Maple Leafs, Edmonton Oilers, and Minnesota North Stars between 1975 and 1985.

Early life
Martin was born in Barrie, Ontario.

Career 
Martin was drafted in the third round, 44th overall, by the Buffalo Sabres in the 1975 NHL Amateur Draft. He was also drafted by the World Hockey Association's New England Whalers; however, he never played in that league.

In his NHL career, Martin appeared in 479 games. He scored 104 goals and added 101 assists. After his playing career, he worked as an assistant coach for six seasons with the American Hockey League's Rochester Americans and for one season in the NHL with the Sabres. He later worked as a scout in the NHL.

Career statistics

Regular season and playoffs

External links
 

1955 births
Living people
Buffalo Sabres coaches
Buffalo Sabres draft picks
Buffalo Sabres players
Buffalo Sabres scouts
Canadian ice hockey left wingers
Charlotte Checkers (SHL) players
Colorado Avalanche scouts
Edmonton Oilers players
Hershey Bears players
Ice hockey people from Simcoe County
London Knights players
Minnesota North Stars players
New Brunswick Hawks players
New England Whalers draft picks
Newmarket Saints players
Nova Scotia Oilers players
Quebec Nordiques players
Rochester Americans coaches
Sportspeople from Barrie
Springfield Indians players
Syracuse Firebirds players
Toronto Maple Leafs players